Edwardsport Power Station is a 618 MW Integrated gasification combined cycle (IGCC) coal based power plant in Vigo Township, Knox County, near the town of Edwardsport, Indiana. The integrated gasification combined cycle power plant (Edwardsport IGCC) construction started in June 2008 by Duke Energy near the site of an older 160 MW coal-fired electrical power plant, which was decommissioned in 2010.

Edwardsport IGCC began commercial operations in June 2013.

Older units
First development was in 1918, followed by Units 2, 3 and 4, rated at 42.5, 42.5 and 75 MW respectively, were placed into service in 1944, 1949 and 1951. The smaller, older units were retired when the new 618-MW plant came online.
The old Edwardsport plant was officially taken offline in late 2011, and deconstruction began in mid-2010. The old Edwardsport plant was demolished in late October 2012.

IGCC units
In 2007, Duke Energy Indiana began construction of a 618 megawatt (MW) integrated gasification combined cycle power plant (IGCC).  This plant was to be the first of its kind of its size.  The gasification process makes coal react with pure oxygen and steam to produce synthetic gas, or syngas. Syngas burns cleaner than burning directly the coal and stripping the pollutants out of the exhaust gas. And syngas may be used to fire a combustion turbine. The combustion turbine exhaust gases are then routed through a large heat recovery steam generator that is used in conjunction with a steam turbine to further increase the plant's efficiency. The new plant is slated to be a base-load station.
The construction of the plant has reserved the necessary space required for carbon capture and storage if Duke Energy decides to add this component to the plant at a later date.   However, when the plant was originally planned, it was thought the site was ready for carbon injection.  After conducting further research, it was determined that the site is actually not geologically suitable for underground storage of carbon.  Instead, Duke Energy Indiana would need to seek approval to construct a pipeline to transport carbon to a more suitable site.

Edwardsport's pollution per unit of energy produced will be greatly reduced, as particulate matter and mercury will be removed from the syngas. The coal-derived synthetic gas is much cleaner than conventional coal combustion to begin with, and it is easier to clean to greater extent. Coal gasification allows carbon capture to occur before the fuel is combusted — a much easier and economically feasible operation than carbon capture of exhaust gases.

Technology
The power plant has two trains of General Electric radiant quench gasification equipment. Each train fuels a General Electric 7FB 236 MW combustion turbine.
Following each GE turbine is a Doosan two pressure Heat recovery steam generator (HRSG). Both HRSG recovered steam powers a single General Electric G13 326 MW four flow, reheat steam turbine. The plant is so defined as a 2 x 1 Combined Cycle. Gross power is 800 MW, but the syngas process consumes much energy, leaving only 618 MW net power to the grid. To save water, cooling is helped by a 20 cell mechanical draft cooling tower.

Cost overruns and controversy
The construction of the Edwardsport IGCC has been clouded in controversy and legal troubles for both Duke Energy Indiana and the Indiana Utility Regulatory Commission.  Thus far, the legal issues have resulted in the resignation of the second highest ranked executive for Duke Energy, the dismissal of the Chairman of the IURC, David Lott Hardy, and Hardy's subsequent indictment for three felony counts of official misconduct in cases concerning Duke Energy, although the charges were dismissed on 12 August 2013.

Production

See also

 List of power stations in Indiana
 Global warming

References

External links
 Edwardsport production data from EIA

Energy infrastructure completed in 1944
Energy infrastructure completed in 1945
Energy infrastructure completed in 1951
Coal-fired power stations in Indiana
Southwestern Indiana
Buildings and structures in Knox County, Indiana
Duke Energy
1944 establishments in Indiana